Austrachelas is a genus of African long-jawed ground spiders in the family Gallieniellidae, and was first described by R. F. Lawrence in 1938. Originally placed with the corinnid sac spiders, it was moved to the Gallieniellidae in 2009.

Species
 ten species are known, all found in South Africa:
Austrachelas bergi Haddad, Lyle, Bosselaers & Ramírez, 2009 – South Africa
Austrachelas entabeni Haddad & Mbo, 2017 – South Africa
Austrachelas incertus Lawrence, 1938 (type) – South Africa
Austrachelas kalaharinus Haddad, Lyle, Bosselaers & Ramírez, 2009 – South Africa
Austrachelas merwei Haddad, Lyle, Bosselaers & Ramírez, 2009 – South Africa
Austrachelas natalensis Lawrence, 1942 – South Africa
Austrachelas pondoensis Haddad, Lyle, Bosselaers & Ramírez, 2009 – South Africa
Austrachelas reavelli Haddad, Lyle, Bosselaers & Ramírez, 2009 – South Africa
Austrachelas sexoculatus Haddad, Lyle, Bosselaers & Ramírez, 2009 – South Africa
Austrachelas wassenaari Haddad, Lyle, Bosselaers & Ramírez, 2009 – South Africa

References

Endemic fauna of South Africa
Araneomorphae genera
Gallieniellidae
Spiders of South Africa